This is list of flags used in Bhutan. For more information about the national flag, see flag of Bhutan.

National flag

Military flags

Police flags

Political flags

Historical flags

See also 

 Flag of Bhutan
 Emblem of Bhutan

References 

Lists and galleries of flags
Flags